Grégory Benoist (born 7 February 1983 in Etterbeek) is a Belgian former flat racing jockey based in France. A son of a jockey, he apprenticed in 1999 at the AFASEC riding school in Chantilly and won his first race in the same year at Vittel. It took him more than ten years to establish himself as a top jockey, winning his first group race in 2009 Prix Miesque with Lixirova and then his first group 1 in 2013 Critérium International aboard Ectot. He was a retained jockey for Al Shaqab Racing in France from 2015 to 2019 and is married to a French trainer Anastasia Wattel.

Major wins 
 France
Critérium International - (1) - Ectot (2013)
Poule d'Essai des Pouliches - (1) - Avenir Certain (2014)
Prix de Diane - (1) - Avenir Certain (2014)
Prix Saint-Alary - (1) - Jemayel (2016)
Prix Jean Prat - (1) - Zelzal (2016)
Prix Rothschild - (1) - Qemah (2016)
Prix d'Ispahan - (1) - Mekhtaal (2017)
Prix Vermeille - (1) - Sweet Lady (2022)

 Great Britain
Coronation Stakes - (1) - Qemah (2016)

References 

1983 births
Living people
People from Etterbeek
French jockeys